Hyposmocoma hygroscopa is a species of moth of the family Cosmopterigidae. It was first described by Edward Meyrick in 1935. It is endemic to Kauai.

External links

hygroscopa
Endemic moths of Hawaii
Moths described in 1935